Edingale is a civil parish in the district of Lichfield, Staffordshire, England.  It contains 19 buildings that are recorded in the National Heritage List for England.  Of these, three are listed at Grade II*, the middle of the three grades, and the others are at Grade II, the lowest grade.  The parish contains the village of Edingale and the settlement of Croxall, and is otherwise rural.  The listed buildings include two churches, memorials in one of the churchyards, a large house with an associated dovecote, smaller houses, cottages, farmhouses and farm buildings, the earliest of which are timber framed, and a bridge.


Key

Buildings

References

Citations

Sources

Lists of listed buildings in Staffordshire